James Forbes (ca. 1731 – March 25, 1780) was an American statesman from Maryland. He served as a delegate to the Continental Congress from 1777 to 1780.

He served as a State Court Judge in 1770 and was a member of the Maryland State House of Delegates from 1777 to 1778.

Forbes died while attending a session of Congress in Philadelphia, where he is buried in the Christ Church Burial Ground.

External links
Forbes's biographic note on U.S. Congress website

1730s births
1780 deaths
Continental Congressmen from Maryland
18th-century American politicians
Year of birth uncertain